The Royal Dutch Cycling Union or KNWU (in Dutch: Koninklijke Nederlandsche Wielren Unie) is the national governing body of cycle racing in the Netherlands.

The aim of the KNWU is to give adequate support for all types of cycling in the Netherlands.

The KNWU is a member of the UCI and the UEC.

Events organized by the KNWU
Dutch Cycling Championships
Dutch National Road Race Championships
Dutch National Time Trial Championships
Dutch National Track Championships
UCI Road World Championships for professionals in 1938, 1948, 1959, 1967, 1979, 1998 and 2012 
UCI Track World Championships for professionals in 1938, 1948, 1959, 1967, 1979 and 2011

External links
 Royal Dutch Cycling Union official website

Netherlands
Cycle racing organizations
Organisations based in the Netherlands with royal patronage
Cycling
Cycle racing in the Netherlands